Avandha Fort, or Avandha Killa, is a fort situated in Aundhewadi village between Nasik and Ahmadnagar in Maharashtra. This fort is close to Patta Fort. The residents of Patta Killa are known as Pattekar, meaning "residents of Fort Patta".

History
The history of this fort is similar to the adjoining Patta fort. On 11 January 1688, this fort was captured by Moghul army headed by Matabarkhan. He appointed Shyamsingh as the chief of the fort. Later this fort was captured by Peshwas in 1761. Finally in 1818 this fort was won by the British.

Places to see
This fort is very difficult to climb due to the broken stone cut steps at many places. Except for rock cut cisterns and steps which lead to the highest point, there are very few structures left on the fort.

Gallery

References 

Buildings and structures of the Maratha Empire
Forts in Nashik district
16th-century forts in India